Coracina is a large genus of birds in the cuckooshrike family Campephagidae.

The genus was introduced by the French ornithologist Louis Jean Pierre Vieillot in 1816. The type species was subsequently designated as the white-bellied cuckooshrike (Coracina papuensis) by the German ornithologist Jean Cabanis in 1850–1851. The name Coracina is from the Ancient Greek  meaning "little raven", a diminutive of korax meaning "raven".

The genus formerly included many more species. It was split based on the results of a molecular phylogenetic study published in 2010. A major clade was moved to the resurrected genus Edolisoma and a smaller group of Asian and Indian Ocean species moved to the genus Lalage.

The genus contains the following 22 species:
 Stout-billed cuckooshrike (Coracina caeruleogrisea)
 Hooded cuckooshrike (Coracina longicauda)
 Cerulean cuckooshrike (Coracina temminckii)
 Pied cuckooshrike (Coracina bicolor)
 Ground cuckooshrike (Coracina maxima)
 Barred cuckooshrike (Coracina lineata)
 Black-faced cuckooshrike (Coracina novaehollandiae)
 Boyer's cuckooshrike (Coracina boyeri)
 Buru cuckooshrike (Coracina fortis)
 Wallacean cuckooshrike (Coracina personata)
 North Melanesian cuckooshrike (Coracina welchmani)
 South Melanesian cuckooshrike (Coracina caledonica)
 Bar-bellied cuckooshrike (Coracina striata)
 Javan cuckooshrike (Coracina javensis)
 Large cuckooshrike (Coracina macei)
 Andaman cuckooshrike (Coracina dobsoni)
 Slaty cuckooshrike (Coracina schistacea)
 White-rumped cuckooshrike (Coracina leucopygia)
 Sunda cuckooshrike (Coracina larvata)
 White-bellied cuckooshrike (Coracina papuensis)
 Manus cuckooshrike (Coracina ingens)
 Moluccan cuckooshrike (Coracina atriceps)

References

 
Bird genera
Taxa named by Louis Jean Pierre Vieillot
Taxonomy articles created by Polbot